Philip Hussey (died 1783), portrait-painter, born at Cork.

Hussey was born at Cloyne, in the county of Cork and his career began as a sailor. He was shipwrecked three times. He drew the figureheads and stern ornaments of vessels, and eventually set up in Dublin as a portrait-painter under the patronage of Lord Chancellor Bowes, painting full-length portraits with some success. He was a good musician, and was skilled as a botanist and florist. His portraits of women are said to be those of men. Although a notable Irish portrait painter, Hussey is not thought to be amongst the most important. His house was a meeting place of many leading men of art and letters in Dublin. He died at an advanced age in 1783 at his house in Earl Street, Dublin.

References

1782 deaths
18th-century Irish painters
Irish male painters
People from Cork (city)
Year of birth unknown